Dominique Lloyd-Walter (born 17 June 1981 in London Borough of Harrow) is a retired professional squash player who represents England. She was educated at Haberdashers' Aske's School for Girls and reached a career-high world ranking of World No. 18 in November 2006.

References

External links 

English female squash players
Living people
1981 births
People from Harrow, London